A constitutional referendum was held in the Comoros on 20 October 1996. The proposed amendments would set the presidential term at 6 years, create a unicameral parliament, and limit the authority of the individual islands' parliaments. The proposals were approved by 85% of voters, with a turnout of around 64%.

Results

References

Comoros
Referendums in the Comoros
Constitutional
Constitutional referendums in the Comoros
Election and referendum articles with incomplete results